Ayub College of Dentistry   is the dental department of Ayub Medical College, one of several medical colleges affiliated to Khyber Medical University located in Abbottabad, Pakistan.

The construction of new building of Ayub College of Dentistry is in progress.

See also 
 Ayub Medical College

References

External links
 Ayub Medical College
 Ayub Alumni Website

Ayub
Dental schools in Pakistan
Khyber Medical University
1998 establishments in Pakistan
Educational institutions established in 1998
Public universities and colleges in Khyber Pakhtunkhwa